The Brno Philharmonic (Czech: Filharmonie Brno) is a Czech orchestra based in Brno, the Czech Republic.  Its principal concert venue in Brno is the Besední dům.  The orchestra also performs regularly in the Janáček Opera House in Brno.  The orchestra receives state support from the city of Brno, the Ministry of Culture of the Czech Republic and the South Moravian Region (Jihomoravský kraj).  The orchestra's current Intendantin is Marie Kučerová.

The precursor ensemble to the orchestra, the Czech Symphony Orchestra, began its existence in the 1870s and was resident at the Besední dům.  The orchestra had to vacate the Besední dům during the time of 1953-1957.  During this period, the current Brno Philharmonic was formed in 1956 with the merger of the Radio Orchestra and the Brno Region Symphony Orchestra.  Břetislav Bakala served as the newly formed orchestra's first principal conductor orchestra, from 1956 to 1958.  The orchestra again vacated the Besední dům in 1989, but returned permanently in 1995.

The orchestra's most recent principal conductor was Aleksandar Marković, from 2009 to 2015. In May 2017, Dennis Russell Davies first guest-conducted with the orchestra. Based on this appearance, in September 2017, the orchestra announced the appointment of Davies as its next principal conductor, effective with the 2018-2019 season, with an initial contract of 4 seasons.

Principal conductors
 Břetislav Bakala (1956–1958)
 Jaroslav Vogel (1959–1962)
 Jiří Waldhans (1962–1978)
 František Jílek (1978–1983)
 Petr Vronský (1983–1991)
 Leoš Svárovský (1991–1995)
 Otakar Trhlík (1995–1997)
 Aldo Ceccato (1997–2000)
 Petr Altrichter (2002–2009)
 Aleksandar Marković (2009–2015)
 Dennis Russell Davies (2018–)

Conductors laureate
 Caspar Richter (2002–present)
 Sir Charles Mackerras (2007–2010)

References

External links
Brno Philharmonic, official website
Czech Music Information Centre article on the orchestra, @ 2001
Recording with the Brno Philharmonic Orchestra

Czech orchestras
Musical groups established in 1956
1956 establishments in Czechoslovakia